Dramatic Romances and Lyrics is a collection of English poems by Robert Browning, first published in 1845 in London, as the seventh volume in a series of self-published books entitled Bells and Pomegranates.

Contents 
Many of the original titles given by Browning to the poems in this collection, as with its predecessor Dramatic Lyrics, are different from the ones he later gave them in various editions of his collected works. Since this book was originally self-published in a very small edition, these poems really only came to prominence in the later collections, and so the later titles are given here; see the bottom of the page for a list of the originals.

 "How They Brought the Good News from Ghent to Aix"
 Pictor Ignotus
 The Italian in England
 The Englishman in Italy
 The Lost Leader
 The Lost Mistress
 Home-Thoughts, from Abroad
 Home-Thoughts, from the Sea
 Nationality in Drinks
 The Bishop Orders His Tomb at St. Praxed's Church
 Garden-Fancies:
 The Flower's Name
 Sibrandus Schafnaburgensis
 The Laboratory
 The Confessional
 The Flight of the Duchess
 Earth's Immortalities:
 Fame
 Love
 Song
 The Boy and the Angel
 Meeting at Night
 Parting at Morning
 Saul
 Time's Revenges
 The Glove

First Edition Titles 
 'How they brought the Good News from Ghent to Aix' (16--)
 Pictor Ignotus (Florence, 15--)
 Italy in England
 England in Italy (Piano di Sorrento)
 The Lost Leader
 The Lost Mistress
 Home-Thoughts, from Abroad
 The Tomb at St. Praxed's (Rome, 15--)
 Garden Fancies
 I. The Flower's Name 
 II. Sibrandus Schafnaburgensis
 France and Spain 
 I. The Laboratory (Ancien Regime)
 II. Spain -- The Confessional
 The Flight of the Duchess
 Earth's Immortalities
 Song ('Nay but you, who do not love her')
 The Boy and the Angel
 Night and Morning
 I. Night
 II. Morning
 Claret and Tokay
  Claret and Tokay here became the first two parts of a longer work, Nationality in Drinks
 Saul (Part I)
 Time's Revenges
 The Glove (Peter Ronsard loquitur)

1845 poems
English poetry collections
Dramatic Romances and Lyrics